The Shadow Ministry of Andrew Peacock was the opposition Coalition shadow ministry of Australia from 12 May 1989 to 3 April 1990, opposing Bob Hawke's Labor ministry.

The shadow ministry is a group of senior opposition spokespeople who form an alternative ministry to the government's, whose members shadow or mark each individual Minister or portfolio of the Government.

Andrew Peacock resumed his position as Leader of the Opposition upon his return as leader of the Liberal Party of Australia on 9 May 1989 and appointed a new Shadow Ministry.

Shadow Ministry
The following were members of the Shadow Ministry:

See also
 Shadow Ministry of John Howard
 Shadow Ministry of John Hewson
 Third Hawke Ministry

References

Liberal Party of Australia
National Party of Australia
Peacock
Opposition of Australia